C. J. Varkey may refer to:

C. J. Varkey, Chunkath, Minister for Indian National Congress in Madras State
C. J. Varkey, Kuzhikulam, Monsignor

Disambiguation pages